Lance Kinder, (born 2 October 1935, in Allahabad) took up veterans Squash in his 40s and rose to Number 1 in the world winning many titles including the British Open and the World Masters. Kinder's record includes having played Squash 72 times for his country since 1992 and only losing once, winning World Championships  and many global squash competitions - many after having a heart attack in his early 60s. Kinder has given much to the sport including holding the Vice-Presidency of the Veterans Squash Rackets Club of Great Britain since 2006. He was also the instigator for the creation of the British National Open and Closed tournament categories for the Over-60s, 65s, 70s, 75s and 80s age groups.

Playing career 

Born 2 October 1935 in India (Allahabad) to British parents he returned home to the UK whilst still a young boy. Always attracted to sports Kinder made his school teams for Football and Cricket but it was whilst he was in the RAF that his sporting talents were identified. He went on to box for the RAF at Fly Weight.
After leaving the RAF, moving his career into tailoring and getting married, sport took back seat. In his 30s went back into sport with Badminton but in his early 40s Squash became the sport of choice. Combining training with playing 5-7 games of squash per week, his standard grew from club level, though regional to English national and world standard. He has played at national and international level in O55, O60, O65, O70 and O75 categories.
Since his 40s Kinder has continuously played at the highest levels of squash, travelling the world to participate in and win many tournaments, including the British Open in 1992 (Over-55s) and in 2005 (Over-70s). Kinder was also a committed county player for Avon. He won 15 county titles in the over 45, 55, and 60 age groups. At the age of 58, in a single year, Kinder played for Avon county team in the over 35, 45 and 55 age groups.
Suffering a serious heart attack in his early 60s could have brought an abrupt end to his sporting life style. However, Kinder went back to Squash and has re-established his position by competing in European and World Championships.
Since the 1990s Kinder has been a member of the Veterans Squash Rackets Club of Great Britain  winning 9 Singles and 22 Doubles titles  in age categories from O55 to O80s.

Squash results

National 

Kinder has represented England in Home International events  playing against Scotland, Wales and Ireland since 1992. At the time of writing (July 2016) he played for his country in the O55, O60, O65, O70 and O75 age groups on a total of 72 occasions and only lost once.

Singles

Doubles

Awards 

Hampshire and Isle of Wight Sportsman of the Year - 2005
Basingstoke Senior & Veteran Award - 2005

References 

1935 births
Living people
British squash players